Andrew Lombard (born July 20, 1997) is an American soccer player who plays as a defender.

Lombard grew up in Montclair, New Jersey and played soccer at Montclair High School.

Career

Youth career
Lombard began his career in the New York Red Bulls Academy at the U-14 level. He also played college soccer for two seasons for both Ohio State University and Northeastern University, making 13 appearances in each of his freshman and sophomore seasons.

Professional career
On March 21, 2017, Lombard signed his first professional contract with New York Red Bulls II.

International career
Lombard was invited to the US U-18 National Identification Camp in 2014 and joined the US U-20 National Team camp in August 2016.

Career statistics

References

External links 
 newyorkredbulls.com profile
 gonu.com profile

1997 births
Living people
American soccer players
New York Red Bulls II players
Association football defenders
USL Championship players
Ohio State Buckeyes men's soccer players
Northeastern Huskies men's soccer players
Soccer players from New Jersey
Montclair High School (New Jersey) alumni
People from Montclair, New Jersey
Sportspeople from Essex County, New Jersey